1977 Women's Nordic Football Championship was the fourth edition of the Women's Nordic Football Championship tournament. It was held from 8 July to 10 July in Mariehamn in Åland.

Standings

Results

Goalscorers 
2 goals
  Ann-Kristin Lindkvist

1 goal
  Susanne Erlandsson
  Anne Grete Holst
  Pia Sundhage
  Birgitta Söderström

Sources 
Nordic Championships (Women) 1977 Rec.Sport.Soccer Statistics Foundation
Landsholdsdatabasen Danish Football Association
Lautela, Yrjö & Wallén, Göran: Rakas jalkapallo — Sata vuotta suomalaista jalkapalloa, p. 418. Football Association of Finland / Teos Publishing 2007. .

Women's Nordic Football Championship
1977–78 in European football
1977 in women's association football
1977
Football in Åland
1977 in Finnish football
1977 in Swedish football
1977 in Danish football
July 1977 sports events in Europe
1977 in Finnish women's sport